Stygobromus barri, commonly called Barr's cave amphipod, is a troglomorphic species of amphipod in family Crangonyctidae. It is endemic to Missouri in the United States.

References

Freshwater crustaceans of North America
Crustaceans described in 1967
Cave crustaceans
Endemic fauna of Missouri
barri